Cătălin Constantin Măruță (born 27 January 1978) is a Romanian television host.

Career
He currently presents the "La Măruță" show on Pro TV. Since June 2002, he has been the host of the "Tonomatul DP2" show on TVR 2. For a few months, at the end of 2005, he worked for Realitatea TV, where he presented another morning show called "Trezeşte-te la realitate cu Cătălin Măruță" ("Wake up to reality with Cătălin Măruță"). Alongside singer Luminița Anghel, he presented the Romanian National Eurovision Selection in 2006 and also hosted a post festival party where all the singers and producers were invited. He returned to hosting the Callatis Club show during the Callatis Festival in August 2006. Starting with 22 October 2007 he presents the TV-show "Happy Hour".
He now presents the TV-show "La Maruta".

The presenter was chosen by DreamWorks Animation to dubbed in Romanian a goose in the animated movie Kung Fu Panda 3.

Personal life
Măruță is married to singer-songwriter Andra, with whom he has two children.

References

External links 

Cătălin Măruță on YouTube

Romanian television personalities
Living people
1978 births